Bertram 'Bep' Johannes Otto Schrieke  (18 September 1890, Zandvoort, Netherlands – 12 September 1945, London, England) was a Dutch politician and academic. He served, alongside Frederik David Holleman, as professor of ethnology and history of the Dutch East Indies (now Indonesia) in Batavia (now Jakarta). From 1939 to 1945 he served as director of the Department of Ethnology at the Colonial Institute, now the Royal Tropical Institute, in Amsterdam. He later served as education minister in the cabinet Colijn V (the fifth cabinet of Hendrikus Colijn). He was also the brother of Jaap Schrieke, a Dutch administrator during the German occupation of the Netherlands.

See also
List of Dutch politicians

External links
 

1890 births
1945 deaths
Ministers of Education of the Netherlands
People from Zandvoort
Academic staff of the University of Amsterdam